The Great Depression is the fourth studio album by American rapper DMX. It was released on October 23, 2001 by Ruff Ryders Entertainment and Def Jam Recordings. The production on the album was handled by multiple producers including Just Blaze, Dame Grease, Black Key and DMX himself. The album also features guest appearances by Stephanie Mills, Faith Evans and Mashonda.

The Great Depression was supported by three singles: "We Right Here", "Who We Be" and "I Miss You". The album demonstrated his continually strong allegiance with the Ruff Ryders. The album received generally mixed to positive reviews from music critics and was a commercial success.  It debuted at number one on the US Billboard 200 chart, selling 440,000 copies in the first week. It became certified platinum in December of that same year.

Singles
The Great Depression was supported by three singles. The first single, "We Right Here" was released on August 14, 2001. The single failed to chart on the Billboard Hot 100 but managed to peaked at number 17 on the US Bubbling Under the Hot 100 chart. The single also peaked at number 43 on the US Hot R&B/Hip-Hop Songs and number eight on the US Hot Rap Songs charts respectively. The second single, "Who We Be" was released on September 25, 2001. Unlike the previous single, it peaked at number 60 on the US Billboard Hot 100 chart.  The single also peaked at number 16 on the US Hot R&B/Hip-Hop Songs and number ten on the US Hot Rap Songs charts. The third single, "I Miss You" was released on January 15, 2002. The single peaked at number 86 on the Billboard Hot 100 chart. It also peaked at number 37 on the US Hot R&B/Hip-Hop Songs chart.

Critical reception
The Great Depression received generally mixed to positive reviews from music critics. At Metacritic, which assigns a normalized rating out of 100 to reviews from professional publications, the album received an average score of 62, based on ten reviews.

Commercial performance
The Great Depression debuted at number one on the US Billboard 200 chart, selling 440,000 copies in its first week. This became DMX's fourth US number one debut on the chart. In its second week, the album dropped to number three on the chart, selling an additional 214,000 copies. On December 14, 2001, the album was certified platinum by the Recording Industry Association of America (RIAA) for shipments of over one million copies in the US. As of October 2009, the album has sold 1,862,000 copies in the United States.

Track listing
Credits adapted from the album's liner notes.

Notes
 "Who We Be" contains additional vocals by Dustin Adams.
 "Bloodline Anthem contains additional vocals by Dia.

Sample credits
 "When I'm Nothing" contains a sample of "Whatcha Gonna Do (with My Lovin')", written by James Mtume and Reggie Lucas, and performed by Stephanie Mills.
 "Pull Up" (Skit) and "Pull Out" (Skit) contain samples of "I'll Be Around (Whenever You Want Me)", written by Thom Bell and Phil Hurtt, and performed by The Spinners.

Charts

Weekly charts

Year-end charts

Certifications

References

External links

2001 albums
DMX (rapper) albums
Albums produced by Swizz Beatz
Albums produced by Just Blaze
Albums produced by Dame Grease
Gangsta rap albums by American artists
Ruff Ryders Entertainment albums